Southern Pacific 4294 is a class "AC-12" 4-8-8-2 Cab forward type steam locomotive that was owned and operated by the Southern Pacific Railroad (SP). It was built by the Baldwin Locomotive Works in March 1944 and was used hauling SP's trains over the Sierra Nevada, often working on Donner Pass in California. Today it is preserved at the California State Railroad Museum (CSRM) in Sacramento, California.

History 
No. 4294 was the last of 20 Southern Pacific class AC-12 4-8-8-2 cab forward locomotives in a larger series of 256 Southern Pacific articulated cab forwards starting with class AC-1. Articulated locomotives are essentially two locomotives sharing fire box, boiler and crew. The front locomotive has its cranks quartered 90 degrees apart. The front and rear drive axles are free to roll out of phase with respect to each other. If unloaded, the locomotive has a vertical oscillation, near 50 mph, that can lift the tires above the rails.

Its most distinguishing feature was that the cab and firebox were at the front of the locomotive instead of the traditional rear. This was done essentially by running a 2-8-8-4 machine backwards with appropriate modifications. The engineer and fireman swapped sides and faced away from the firebox. The tender remained behind the locomotive to maintain the improved forward vision; this was possible because the locomotive burned Bunker C fuel oil rather than coal, so the fuel could easily be piped from the tender to the firebox, unlike a coal-burning locomotive. The smoke box end coupling was strengthened. The power reverse lever (Johnson Bar) and steam throttle motion direction were reversed. The drive wheel axles were also reversed, end for end without rekeying the return "fly" cranks, to reverse the expansion link timing on both sides.

The cab forward design was useful in the long tunnels and snow sheds of Donner Pass and other mountainous regions where it kept smoke, heat, and soot away from the operating crew, allowing them to breathe clean air in such enclosed spaces. It entered service on March 19, 1944 and was retired from active service on March 5, 1956.

Preservation 
The SP was convinced to preserve one of the class and donated No. 4294 to the City of Sacramento, California, where it was put on outdoor display October 19, 1958 at the SP station next to the C. P. Huntington, the railroad's first locomotive. Construction for Interstate 5 necessitated a move for the locomotive and it was stored in the SP shops until May 1981. At that time it was moved again, this time to its current location, the California State Railroad Museum, where it remains on static display.

If it had never been for the negotiating efforts of the Railway and Locomotive Historical Society in the 1950s, No. 4294 likely would have been scrapped along with all of the other SP cab forward locomotives. As a result, No. 4294 is the only SP cab forward that has been preserved.

Planned Restoration 
At one time, it was hoped that No. 4294 could be restored to operating condition. According to CSRM personnel, the biggest impediments toward such a project are the estimated costs and the current policies of both Union Pacific Railroad and BNSF Railway in regards to operations.  The cost of such a restoration is estimated between $1 million and $1.5 million, an amount that the museum feels would be prohibitive given the current prospects for its eventual operation.

References

Further reading 
 

4294
4-8-8-2 locomotives
Baldwin locomotives
Individual locomotives of the United States
Simple articulated locomotives
Railway locomotives introduced in 1944
Standard gauge locomotives of the United States
Preserved steam locomotives of California